Genital reconstructive surgery may refer to: 

 Clitoridectomy, any surgery to reduce or remove tissue from the clitoris
 Foreskin restoration, a process of expanding penile skin to mimic the foreskin
 Hypospadias, surgery to modify the location of the urinary outlet on a phallus
 Intersex medical interventions, performed to modify atypical or ambiguous genitalia
 For a historical perspective, see History of intersex surgery
 Labiaplasty, plastic surgery to alter the folds of skin surrounding the vulva
 Phalloplasty, the construction or reconstruction of a penis
 Metoidioplasty, the construction of a penis from a hormonally-enlarged clitoris in female-to-male sex reassignment surgery 
 Sex reassignment surgery, to alter a person's existing sexual characteristics to resemble those of their identified gender
 Sex reassignment surgery (female-to-male), a variety of procedures for transgender men 
 Sex reassignment surgery (male-to-female), reshaping male genitals into the appearance and function of female genitalia
 Vaginoplasty, any type of surgical procedure to the vagina, vulva or related structures

See also
 Circumcision, removal of the foreskin from the human penis
 Penile implant, implantation of a penile prosthesis to treat various disorders
 Female genital mutilation, the ritual removal of some or all of the external female genitalia
 Genital modification and mutilation, permanent or temporary changes to human sex organs